Strandiata renominata is a species of beetle in the family Cerambycidae, and the type species of its genus. It was described by Vitali F. and Vitali C. in 2012. It is known to be from Ethiopia.

References

Endemic fauna of Ethiopia
Phrissomini
Beetles described in 2012